2moro is a Taiwanese boyband, whose members are identical twins Anthony Guo (郭彥均) and Angus Guo (郭彥甫). The twins are graduates from Taipei Physical Education College.

The twins got their first taste of stardom in their third year of school, when an advertising company was seeking two similar-looking persons for the filming of a sportswear commercial, and found them a good choice. Before recording their first album, they had worked with female group S.H.E in the film Reaching For The Stars (真命天女) and with Singaporean actors in the Mediacorp drama production Rainbow Connections (舞出彩虹).

They released their first album, Twins' First Disc (雙胞胎的初回盤), on 6 January 2006. The album features 11 songs, and the hit song Exciting 2006 (刺激2006) is composed from excerpts of 23 songs by other singers such as Stefanie Sun, Leehom Wang and F4, with each line an excerpt from a different song. A second song from their album, Holding Your Hand (牵着你) enjoyed a stay of two weeks on Singapore's YES 933 music charts, reaching the 19th spot for the week of 26 February 2006. A third song, Shabu Shabu, is a Chinese cover of Dragostea din Tei by O-Zone.

Both brothers currently co-host a variety show 食尚玩家(Super Taste) on TVBS Entertainment Channel and TVBS-Asia

Discography 

 2006: 2moro 
 2006: 2 More Loves

References 

 
 
  Cast of Reaching for the Stars
 —an interview with cast members of Rainbow Connections.
  Y.E.S. 933 music charts, week 9 of 2006 (26 February)

External links 

2moro's Official Blog 2Moro部落格- 無名小站
Anthony's Personal Microblog Weibo 郭彥均 新浪微博
Angus' Personal Microblog Weibo 郭彥甫 新浪微博

Mandopop musical groups
Taiwanese boy bands
Taiwanese twins
Identical twins